Anders Grillhammar (born 7 September 1964) is a former Swedish freestyle swimmer. Grillhammar participated in the 1984 Summer Olympics, competing in the 400m freestyle, where he finished 21st.

References

Clubs
Stockholmspolisens IF

1964 births
Living people
Swimmers at the 1984 Summer Olympics
Olympic swimmers of Sweden
Swedish male freestyle swimmers
Place of birth missing (living people)
20th-century Swedish people